Diane Watson (born January 21, 1964) is an American compound archer. She is the current World Archery number nine in women's compound archery. The highest ranking she has reached is the eighth position, which she reached for the last time in May 2012.

Achievements
Source:
		

2009
 World Cup, women's team, Santo Domingo
 World Outdoor Championships, women's team, Ulsan
25th, World Outdoor Championships, individual, Ulsan
2010
 Arizona Cup, women's team, Phoenix, Arizona
 World Cup, women's team, Poreč
 World Cup, women's team, Ogden
 World Cup, women's team, Shanghai

2011
 Copa Merengue, women's team, Santo Domingo
 Copa Merengue, individual, Santo Domingo
 World Cup, women's team, Shanghai
2012
 Arizona Cup, women's team, Phoenix, Arizona
 World Cup, individual, Shanghai

References

External links
 

American female archers
Living people
1964 births
21st-century American women